is a Japanese politician serving as the mayor of Sendai. She was formerly a member of the Democratic Party of Japan and served in the House of Representatives. A native of Sendai, Miyagi and graduate of Tohoku Gakuin University, she was elected for the first time in 2005 after working at a TV broadcaster.

References

External links 

 Official website in Japanese.

Living people
1957 births
People from Sendai
Female members of the House of Representatives (Japan)
Members of the House of Representatives (Japan)
Democratic Party of Japan politicians
Women mayors of places in Japan
21st-century Japanese politicians
21st-century Japanese women politicians
Tohoku Gakuin University alumni